Christine Borland  (born 1965) is a Scottish artist. Born in Darvel, Ayrshire, Scotland, Borland is one of the Young British Artists (YBAs) and was nominated for the Turner Prize in 1997 (won by Gillian Wearing) for her work From Life at Tramway, Glasgow.  Borland  works and lives in Kilcreggan, Argyll, as a BALTIC Professor at the BxNU Institute of Contemporary Art.

Borland studied Environmental Art at the Glasgow School of Art and later was awarded an MA from the University of Ulster in 1988. She was on the committee of Transmission Gallery, Glasgow from 1989 to 1991. In 2004, she became one of five artist awarded the prestigious Glenfiddich Artist in Residence programme. In 2012 she was appointed BALTIC Northumbria University Professor – where she heads the Institute of Contemporary Art in Newcastle upon Tyne. This is a collaborative venture between Northumbria University and the BALTIC Centre for Contemporary Art.

Borland is leading member of artists who contributed to the transformation of Glasgow in 1990s as an internationally recognised hub of contemporary arts. Across an international career of 25 years, Borland is recognised for cross-disciplinary projects with other fields, such as medical science and forensics, to explore ideas related to history of medicine, medical ethics and human genetics. She has said, "The heart of what I am trying to discuss is very dark, very strong and passionate, and if you can reach that through quite a rational process, I think it
becomes more powerful, and importantly, more powerful to the viewer."

Borland was elected a Fellow of the Royal Society of Edinburgh in 2020.

Practice 
Christine Borland's works sculpture, printmaking and photography and with a variety of materials including glass, china, fabric and bronze. She often asks us to consider the fragility of human life and the way in which it is valued by social systems and institutions. Borland's practice highlights the depersonalisation of an individual's identity in Modern medical practices, and her work attempts to regain physicality and identity. Borland questions how we identify scientific fact, objectivity and truth together with traditional, conventional forms of art material, such as bronze or ceramics, together with new technologies.

Borland's work, From Life, was nominated for the Turner Prize in 1997  She started with the skeleton of a missing person that she purchased legally from a medical supplies company and received it in the post, and then worked with medicine, forensics, judicial and police institutions to obtain information about the person. The end product was an exhibition of the skeleton, a bronze cast of the head using facial reconstruction. It was an attempt to reclaim the individual identity of the skeleton, and to turn an objective object into an understood, specific human.

In November 1996, at the Sean Kelly Gallery, she presented the work "Second Class Male, Second Class Female" (a second-class man, a second-class woman), in which she reconstructed the heads of two people.

LHomme Double was first exhibited in 1997. Borland asked 6 different academically-trained artists to make a clay portraitbust of the notorious Nazi War criminal, Josef Mengele, otherwise known as the Angel of Death. Borland obtained two grainy black-and-white portrait photographs and a short description of Mengele's physical appearance from Auschwitz survivors. This same information was provided to the 6 artists and was used to create portraitbusts.  The portrait busts are all different, each presented on a simple wooden frame as if straight from the artist's studio. Each is made of clay and left unfired, emphasising the overall lack of certainty and finality. When seen together, the six portraits do not provide a clear, recognisable, singular identity, but a number of possibilities.

The Dead Teach the Living (1997), originally displayed at the 1997 Munster Sculpture Project in Germany, was a group of computer-reconstructed heads cast in white plaster that show different racial stereotypes.

After a True Story—Giant and Fairy Tales (1997) showed a negative impression of the skeletal remains of an 18th-century dwarf and contrasted them with a 19th-century giant. Phantom Twins (1997), consisted of leather "dolls" containing real foetal skeletons.

Selected exhibitions

 Second Class Male, Second Class Female, November 1996
 L'Homme Double, 1997, Lisson Gallery
 The Dead Teach the Living, 1997, Skulpture Projekte Münster, Münster Germany
 Solo exhibitions include the Fabric Workshop and Museum (Philadelphia), Dundee Contemporary Arts, De Appel (Amsterdam), Fundação Serralves (Lisbon), Museum für Gegenwartskunst (Zurich) and Cast From Nature, Camden Arts Centre (London).
 In 2015 she collaborated with Brody Condon on Circles of Focus, presented at CCA Glasgow.

Selected collections 

 Scottish National Gallery of Modern Art, Edinburgh
Tate Gallery, London

See also
British Art

References

External links
 Christine Borland - Artist Website
 Designer Bodies
 Video of the artist creating and preparing works for the Camden Arts Centre exhibition "Cast from Nature" May–July 2011{link}
 Christine Borland at Artist Pension Trust

1965 births
Living people
20th-century Scottish women artists
21st-century Scottish women artists
Alumni of the Glasgow School of Art
Alumni of Ulster University
British conceptual artists
Fellows of the Royal Society of Edinburgh
People from East Ayrshire
Scottish contemporary artists
Young British Artists
Women conceptual artists